The Montenegrin Volleyball League (montenegrin: Odbojkaški savez Crne Gore) is the highest level of men's volleyball in Montenegro and it is organized by Montenegrin Volleyball Federation. In the Montenegrin Volleyball League currently competes 8 clubs.

History

Before independence
In the period before independence, Montenegrin volleyball clubs played in SFR Yugoslavia, FR Yugoslavia and Serbia and Montenegro competitions. From the season 1980-81, OK Budućnost from Podgorica became a permanent member of Second Yugoslav League, where other Montenegrin teams also played one or few seasons (Budvanska Rivijera, Rudar Pljevlja, Brskovo Mojkovac, Lovćen Cetinje). First time when Montenegrin teams played in the top-tier was during the season 1991-92. During that edition, in Yugoslav First League debuted two clubs from Montenegro - OK Budućnost and OK Budvanska Rivijera  (at that time OK Avala). While Budućnost remained a member of top-tier all the time, Budvanska Rivijera was relegated after two consecutive seasons. Team from Budva made a comeback to the top-tier on season 1997-98.
From the end of nineties, in FR Yugoslavia and Serbia and Montenegro, two clubs played important role, with four champion titles. First significant success made Budućnost on season 1997-98, as they participated in the playoff finals. Team from Podgorica didn't succeed to win the title, as they were defeated in the three-game series against Vojvodina (0-3 in series).
The first national title for some Montenegrin team came on season 2000-01. In the playoff final series, Budvanska Rivijera held the title after four games against Milicionar (3-1 in series).
Next year, two Montenegrin teams played in the Yugoslav playoff finals. Budućnost won the final stage against Budvanska Rivijera (3-1 in series) and held the first trophy in the club's history. Their four games were remembered by big rivalry and the highest attendance in the history of final series (average 4,500 per game), while one of the games in Podgorica attended 7,500 spectators, which remained the all-time record attendance for Yugoslav volleyball championship.
During the next two seasons, Budvanska Rivijera played in the final series, but both times lost, 2002-03 against Crvena Zvezda (0-3 in series) and 2003-04 against Vojvodina (0-3 in series).
On season 2004-05, Budućnost won their second title of national champion. In the final series, they dominated against Vojvodina (3-0 in series). Team from Podgorica defended the trophy on season 2005-06. Once again, their opponent in the playoff final was Vojvodina (3-2 in series).
From the beginning of the new century, Budućnost and Budvanska Rivijera started to play in CEV Champions League.
Below is the list of Budućnost and Budvanska Rivijera champion titles won in Yugoslavia / Serbia and Montenegro Championship.

Except that, from the nineties, Montenegrin clubs like Elektroprivreda (Nikšić), Luka Bar (Bar), Studentski centar (Podgorica) and Pljevlja often played in the Second Yugoslav League. Lowest-tier competition was Montenegrin Republic League, which existed from 1978 to 2006.

After independence
Soon after the Montenegrin independence referendum, Volleyball Federation of Montenegro founded its own competitions, with the First League as a top-tier competition. Since founded, Montenegrin First League had various number of participants: 2006/07 - 7 clubs; 2007/08 - 8 clubs; 2008/09 - 8 clubs; 2009/10 - 8 clubs; 2010/11 - 6 clubs; 2011/12 - 8 clubs; 2012/13 - 4 clubs; 2013/14 - 8 clubs; 2014/15 - 6 clubs; 2015/16 - 6 clubs; 2016-17 - 6 clubs; 2017-18 - 6 clubs, 2018-19 - 5 clubs, 2019-20 - 5 clubs.
During the first decade of Montenegrin championship, most successful club was OK Budvanska Rivijera, who held eight consecutive trophies from season 2008-09 to 2015-06. Other club which ever won a title of Montenegrin Volleyball League in period 2006-2016 is OK Budućnost, who did it during the first two editions of the championship.
On season 2016-17, champions title gained OK Jedinstvo from Bijelo Polje, which became the first team from northern Montenegro who won the Championship. A year later, OK Jedinstvo won another title, but without OK Budvanska Rivijera in league, who was dissolved.
Edition 2017-18 is won by OK Budva, who became a successor of strong volleyball tradition in the city of Budva. In playoff finals, OK Budva won the series against OK Budućnost (3-0).
Season 2019-20 was interrupted after eight weeks, due to the coronavirus pandemic. Montenegrin volleyball federation decided that placement after the eight weeks was the final one, so OK Budva won their second trophy in the history.

Champions
From the inaugural season (2006/07), four different clubs were the champions of Montenegrin Volleyball League. OK Budvanska Rivijera won 8 titles, while OK Budućnost, OK Jedinstvo and OK Budva won 2 titles. Below is the list of top-placed teams by every single season.

Titles by seasons

Sources:

Titles by team

Montenegrin League
Below is a list of clubs with titles won in Montenegrin Volleyball League.

Overall
Below is an overall list, with titles won in both leagues - Montenegrin Volleyball League and FR Yugoslavia / Serbia and Montenegro Championship.

Participants

All-time participants (2006-)
Since foundation, in Montenegrin Volleyball League participated 15 different clubs. OK Budućnost and OK Jedinstvo are the only two teams which participated in every single season. Below is a list of participants with number of seasons in the competition.

Current teams
Montenegrin Volleyball League 2019-20 have five participants. Below is the list of clubs in current season.

Montenegrin clubs in European volleyball competitions

Montenegrin volleyball clubs are participating in the CEV competitions since the season 1995-96. 
First team which ever competed at the European cups was OK Budućnost Podgorica. Except them, in CEV competitions played also OK Budvanska Rivijera Budva, OK Sutjeska Nikšić, OK Jedinstvo Bijelo Polje and OK Studentski Centar Podgorica.
Among other competitions, OK Budućnost and OK Budvanska Rivijera played a numerous seasons in CEV Champions League, with few participations in the final phases of competition.
During the overall history, five different Montenegrin clubs played in CEV competitions.

As of the end of CEV competitions 2019–20 season.

See also
 Montenegrin volleyball Cup
 Volleyball Federation of Montenegro (OSCG)
 Montenegrin women's volley league

References

External links
 Volleyball Federation of Montenegro

Volleyball in Montenegro
Montenegro